The Maison Gabrielle Roy (or Maison Roy)—translated in English as the House of Gabrielle Roy (or Roy House)—is a museum in the former home of writer Gabrielle Roy. The house is located in the Saint Boniface area of Winnipeg, Manitoba, Canada. The objective of the museum is to disseminate the works of Roy and to preserve a piece of heritage for Canadian history.

From 1909 to 1937, Roy lived in the heart of Saint Boniface. The house was restored and opened to the public in 2003.  The site was designated a National Historic Site of Canada in 2008.

The Museum is open year round and offers services in English or French. It is affiliated with: CMA,  CHIN, and Virtual Museum of Canada.

References

External links

La Maison Gabrielle Roy

Biographical museums in Canada
Maison Gabrielle Roy
National Historic Sites in Manitoba
Municipal Historical Resources of Winnipeg
Provincial Heritage Sites of Manitoba
Saint Boniface, Winnipeg